Aconite may refer to:
Aconitum, a plant genus containing the monkshoods
Aconitine, a toxin derived from some of the plants of genus Aconitum
Winter aconite, a plant in the genus Eranthis